Hog farm may refer to:
Pig farming
Intensive pig farming, modern large-scale farming of domestic pigs 
Hog Farm, America's longest running hippie commune
"Hog Farm", English title of a 1974 Swedish song by Pugh Rogefeldt